Zakian (also Romanized as Zakīān, Zakeyān, and Zakīyān; also known as Bābā Kūhak, Kūrnī, and Zakīān-e Bābā Kūhak) is a village in Banesh Rural District, Beyza District, Sepidan County, Fars Province, Iran. At the 2006 census, its population was 254, in 53 families.

References 

Populated places in Beyza County